Teri Laadli Main is an Indian television drama series that aired from 5 January 2021 till 22 April 2021 on Star Bharat. Produced by Panorama Entertainment, it stars Hemangi Kavi, Mayuri Kapadane and Gaurav Wadhwa. The series is remake of Star Maa's Telugu series Mouna Raagam. The series went off air abruptly without conclusion on 22 April 2021 due to its very low TRP ratings and due to global COVID-19 pandemic situation.

Plot
Urmila and Surender are couples who live with Surender's mother, Durga. Urmila is a kind hearted woman who cares for everyone whereas, Surender is a cruel man who finds girls to be a burden. The couple had a girl child Gauri. Urmila becomes pregnant with a girl child for the second time, but this time Surender decides to kill the baby since he can't afford for another child. He with the help of Durga poisons Urmila. Luckily, the child survives but is born mute due to the poison. Surender and his mother is terrified since the child is a girl and is mute. Surender consults an astrologer who predicts that the child would bring misfortune to the family. Everybody are terrified, as a result, they mistreat the child except Urmila who feels they should care for her. They name the girl Bitti. Urmila gets pregnant for the third time and gives birth to a boy named Yash. As time passes by, Gauri used to get ignored and Yash used to get all the love. Bitti however, was totally treated as a burden.

Bitti grows up into a young woman. Though mute, she is talented and intelligent but still, longs for father's affection. One day, in her childhood, Bitti had saved the life of a rich boy named Akshat. Akshat now feels that he lives because of Bitti and becomes fond of her. Eventually, he decides to employ her as a cook in his construction company. In the end, both falls for each other leading to Akshat abandoning his friend Sakshi. In fact, Akshat doesn't know that Bitti is mute and thinks that she is silence fasting. Bitti decides to reveal the bitter truth to him. Akshat is shocked at first but decides to transform her into a bold young woman. Sakshi is heartbroken that Akshat left her and becomes jealous of Bitti. She vows her revenge on her.

Cast

Main
 Mayuri Kapadane as Bitti Kumar: Urmila and Surender's second daughter; Gauri and Yash's sister (2021)
 Maithali Patwardhan as Young Bitti (2021)
 Gaurav Wadhwa as Akshat: Bitti and Sakshi's love interest; Vaishali's son; Richa's elder brother (2021)
 Aarav Wadhwa as Young Akshat (2021)
 Hemangi Kavi as Urmila Kumar: Surender's wife; Bitti, Gauri and Yash's mother (2021)
 Pankaj Singh as Surender Kumar: Bitti, Gauri and Yash's father (2021)

Recurring
 Nisha Nagpal as Sakshi; Supriya's daughter; Akshat's friend who loves him (2021)
 Swati Katyal as Young Sakshi (2021)
 Nilima Singh as Vaishali: Akshat and Richa's mother; a woman who hates disability due to her tragic past (2021)
 Neena Cheema as Durga Kumar: Surender's mother; Bitti, Gauri and Yash's paternal grandmother (2021)
 Vivaan Singh Rajput as Yash Kumar: Urmila and Surender's only son; Bitti and Gauri's younger brother (2021)
 Shruthi Anand as Gauri Kumar; Urmila and Surender's eldest daughter; Bitti and Yash's elder sister (2021)
 Mehul Nissar as Ashok: Surender's friend; Urmila and Bitti's well-wisher (2021)
 Payal Gupta as Siddhi: Ashok's daughter and Bitti's best–friend (2021)
 Rudra Kaushish; Supriya's husband and Sakshi's father (2021)
 Anshu Varshney as Supriya: Sakshi's mother (2021)
 Palak Jain as Richa (2021)
 Prince Sharma as Raju (2021)

Production

Casting
Child actor Harshita Ojha was first approached to play young Bitti, but was replaced by Maithali Patwardhan who played the same role in Mulgi Zali Ho, the Marathi version of the series. Hemangi Kavi was cast to play the role of Bitti's mother.

Release
The first promo of the series was released on 14 December 2020, featuring Hemangi Kavi and Pankaj Singh. 
The next promo was released on 23 December 2020, featuring Mayuri Kapadane, Hemangi Kavi and Pankaj Singh.

Adaptations

References

External links
 

Indian drama television series
Indian television soap operas
Hindi-language television shows
2021 Indian television series debuts
Star Bharat original programming
Television shows set in Uttar Pradesh